Argentina has participated in editions of the Summer Universiade.

Medal count

Summer Universiade
Argentina has won 7 medals in appearances at the Summer Universiade

References

External links
 FISU History at the FISU

 
Nations at the Universiade
Student sport in Argentina